ZED.TO was an alternate reality game run in Toronto in 2012. Players assumed roles as interns and employees in a fictional and futuristic biotechnology corporation called ByoLogyc, and experienced the company's rise and disastrous fall first-hand through social media, online videos and websites, and live-action immersive theatrical events.

ZED.TO was produced by Toronto design collective The Mission Business; founded by Elenna Mosoff, Trevor Haldenby, Martha Haldenby, David Fono, and Byron Laviolette and was crowdfunded on indiegogo in 2012.

Recognition
ZED.TO won the inaugural Performance Innovation Award at the 2012 Toronto Fringe Festival, as well as Best In Show at the 2012 World Future Society Beta Launch competition, Best in Biological Design at Autodesk University, and Best in Cross-Platform Fiction at the 2012 Digi Awards.

Cast
 Andrew Moyes - Chet Getram
 Liam Toshio Morris - Davian Baxter
 Karen Donald - Bernice Hammersmith
 Emily Schooley - Dahlia Joss
 James Fanizza - Tyler Wyatt
 Janet Kish - Rentata Reinger
 Caitlin B. Driscoll - Marie LeClerc
 Kwan Ho Tse - Henry Chan
 Burton Wright - Brad Mitchell
 Ariana Leask - Adrian Quinn
 Shane Hollon - Dennis Kirkham
 Martha Haldenby - Olive Swift
 Adam Barrett - Paul Fischer
 Jennifer Walls - Felicity Chapman

References

External links
 

Alternate reality games
2012 in Canada